Thompson Point is a point of land in Antarctica which descends northeastward from Kavrayskiy Hills into the west part of the terminus of Rennick Glacier. Mapped by United States Geological Survey (USGS) from surveys and U.S. Navy aerial photographs, 1960–62. Named by Advisory Committee on Antarctic Names (US-ACAN) for Max C. Thompson, United States Antarctic Research Program (USARP) biologist at McMurdo Station, 1966–67.

References

Headlands of Victoria Land
Pennell Coast